Richard Jarrett  (born 1870) was a Welsh international footballer. He was part of the Wales national football team between 1889 and 1890, playing 2 matches and scoring 3 goals. He played his first match on 27 April 1889 against Ireland. In this game he scored a hattrick and Wales won with 3–0. He played his last match on 22 March 1890 against Scotland.

See also
 List of Wales international footballers (alphabetical)
 List of Wales national football team hat-tricks

References

1870 births
Welsh footballers
Wales international footballers
Place of birth missing
Date of death missing
Association footballers not categorized by position